Brauner is a surname. Notable people with the surname include:

People
Artur Brauner (1918–2019), also called Atze Brauner, German film producer and entrepreneur
Asher Brauner (born 1946), American actor
Alfred Brauner (1910-2002), French-Austrian scholar, child psychologist and author
Bohuslav Brauner (1855–1935), Czech chemist
Harry Brauner (1908–1988), Romanian ethnomusicologist and composer
Henry Brauner (born 1984), also called George Valencia, American-Filipino soccer player
Jo Brauner (born 1937), German journalist
Victor Brauner (1903–1966), also called Viktor Brauner, Romanian painter

Families
 Brauner family, Swedish noble family

See also
The Von Brauners, a professional wrestling tag team/stable consisting of several members with the character surname Von Brauner
Braun 
Brawner

German-language surnames